Kevin Madison, also known as K-Solo (born April 17, 1968) is an American rapper from Brentwood, New York who, along with Redman, EPMD, Das EFX, and Keith Murray, was part of the Hit Squad in the 1990s.

Career
K-Solo was a member of EPMD's "Hit Squad", featuring on the group's hit Head Banger. His biggest solo hits were "Your Mom's in My Business" and "Spellbound." The rapper later accused DMX of stealing this style when the two were serving time in the same jail. DMX has disputed whether K-Solo developed this style during the 16 months he served in Riverhead Correctional Facility after being convicted of assault in the 1980s or during a later stay in Suffolk jail.

In the mid-1990s he signed with Death Row Records and almost signed to Death Row East after hooking up with them in a Pittsburgh concert show. The only track ever released was a bootleg of Kurupt and him freestyling over Snoop's "Gin and Juice". It can be found on YouTube.

In 2003 he toured the world with PMD and DJ Honda and vowed never again citing PMD "flipping over nearly everything but his ticket and record sales."

In 2004 he was working on a new album for his Waste Management Records tentatively titled "There Will Be Hell to Pay" which has not been released.

Feuds

DMX
During the mid-1990s through the early 2000s (decade), DMX and K-Solo, who first met as inmates in prison during the course of K-Solo's three-year prison stint, disputed over who was the first to write "Spellbound".  Despite that K-Solo released his version in 1990, DMX, who released his version in 1991, claimed that he was the first to write "Spellbound". In his 1998 hit single "Get At Me Dog", DMX told K-Solo to "suck [his] dick". K-Solo later responded to DMX on a track named "The Answer Back", in which K-Solo claimed to be DMX's real father, and alleged that the legitimate reason for DMX's disgruntlement was because K-Solo had given DMX's mother a sexually transmitted infection. As the track continues, K-Solo went on to vindicate himself by saying that it was in fact DMX's mother that had "burned" him first. On Beef II, K-Solo took a lie detector test to prove that he was the first to write "Spellbound". The results were inconclusive.

In an August 2006 interview, he said "The truth of the matter is that being in L.A., I have people that I never would in LA, like Tito Ortiz, Chuck Lidell, true beat-that-ass-niggas. I have personally talked to the UFC folks and they would love to see us fight, I would love to see us fight. I mean we are forever going to be linked in the beef shit because there has not been a clear winner. I feel that I destroyed him, I assume he feels the same. It’s obvious we both don’t like each other and I think it’s the only way to settle this beef, but let’s face it, I saw dude do 50 push-ups and almost fall down afterwards. It took like 10 minutes to catch his breath to smoke another cigarette. Obviously he is not ready for that. It would be the biggest deal in hip-hop in 20 years."

In a January 2007 interview, he was asked why DMX continued to seek conflict, especially with his recent appearance on Hot 97 and stated "He knows what it is. I told him to get into the cage with me. Five rounds, homie, fight me! He wouldn't do it. I am asking Keith Murray to do the same. I’ll break his ass down in two. He’s a five dollar dude. Sign the papers, we’ll set it up, and can handle it. That goes for any ma’fucka who has problems with me. We’ll get in the cage. If you can beat me, you get the money and I’ll get my ass beat. Let people do what they got to do. I’m in war mode. I’m more ready now than I've ever been. People aren't getting away with that dumb shit. DMX can’t fight."

Keith Murray
In a January 2007 interview, he responded to claims that he [Keith] knocked him out:

"I was in the hood watching these guys. I ran with one of these guys who was in the hood. A while back, my boy – Ralph Mann got jumped by a few of the L.O.D. cats Keith Murray’s crew]. They were disrespecting Ralph! I put Murray and Redman in the game! So, I put they asses on blast on a mixtape! Murray’s men jumped me on stage and threw me off the bitch. They’re now in court because of the shit. But let me ask you -- how do I get jumped in your club on Christmas Eve and walk out still alright? I could’ve respected it if Murray ran up on me and did his thing. But he didn’t. He thinks that the world is against him. If there was no Kevin Madison there wouldn’t be no Keith Murray, because no one would’ve respected him. Why fight someone that put you on? The only thing that I can think is that Reggie and Erick put him on to doing it. These cats are crazy, though. People were hurt when the Hit Squad broke up. I know people who can call on J. Prince and really cause some problems. Cats are just stupid. That’s the only thing that aggravates me. What else do I have to do to show people that I’m the “original rap criminal”? People don't know what they're playing with."

Discography

Albums

Singles

Filmography
Beef II (2004)
2fast2real (2004)
2Fast2real3  (2008)

References

External links

 Yahoo! Music Profile

1968 births
African-American male rappers
Atlantic Records artists
Living people
21st-century American rappers
21st-century American male musicians
Death Row Records artists
Hit Squad members